This is a list of flag bearers who have represented Haiti at the Olympics.

Flag bearers carry the national flag of their country at the opening ceremony of the Olympic Games.

See also
Haiti at the Olympics

References

Haiti at the Olympics
Haiti
Olympic flagbearers
Olympic flagbearers